Billy Jones may refer to:

Sports
Billy Jones (baseball), baseball coach at Appalachian State
Billy Jones (basketball), Maryland Terrapins basketball player
Billy Jones (footballer, born 1876), English footballer
Billy Jones (footballer, born 1881) (1881–1948), English footballer who played for Small Heath/Birmingham and Brighton & Hove Albion
Billy Jones (footballer, born 1983), English footballer defender
Billy Jones (footballer, born 1987), English footballer, currently playing for Rotherham United F.C.
Billy Lot Jones, Welsh footballer and Manchester City F.C. player

Music
Billy Jones (singer, born 1889) (1889–1940), 1920–1930s American tenor and half of The Happiness Boys with Ernie Hare
Billy Jones (Outlaws guitarist) (1949–1995), American guitarist with the rock band Outlaws
 Billy Jones, guitarist and vocalist with London-based music group Heatwave

Other
William "Billy" Jones (1884–1968), American railroad operator
Billy Jones (artist) (1935–2012), American-born artist and poet who immigrated to Australia
Billy Jones (New York politician), New York State Assemblyman

See also
Bill Jones (disambiguation)
William Jones (disambiguation)
Willie Jones (disambiguation)
Will Jones (disambiguation)